Manhandled is a 1924 American silent drama film directed by Allan Dwan and starring Gloria Swanson. The film was produced by Famous Players-Lasky at their East Coast Astoria Studios facility and distributed by Paramount Pictures.  The supporting cast includes Frank Morgan. A young woman goes out partying when her hard-working boyfriend neglects her.

Prints exist of this Swanson feature.

Plot
The shop girl Tessie McGuire is invited by her boss to a fun party. There she acts like a Russian duchess. The owner of an expensive department store hires her to attract customers. As she finds her way in the New York's higher milieu, she alienates most of her friends.

Cast

References

External links

Manhandled at silentera.com
Manhandled lobby poster
Lobby poster
Stills at silenthollywood.com
Manhandled at Odysee

1924 films
1924 romantic drama films
American black-and-white films
American romantic drama films
Famous Players-Lasky films
American silent feature films
Films based on short fiction
Films directed by Allan Dwan
Films set in New York City
Films shot in New York City
Surviving American silent films
1920s American films
Silent romantic drama films
Silent American drama films
1920s English-language films